Ondjiva Pereira Airport  is an airport serving Ondjiva (alternate spellings: Ongiva, Ngiva, N'giva) in Cunene Province, Angola.

The N'giva non-directional beacon (Ident: GI) is located on the field.

Airlines and destinations

See also
 List of airports in Angola
 Transport in Angola

References

External links
 
 
OurAirports - Ngiva
OpenStreetMap - Ngiva
 

Ondjiva